District X, also known as Mutant Town or the Middle East Side, is a fictional location appearing in American comic books published by Marvel Comics. It is a neighborhood in New York City primarily populated by mutants, first seen during Grant Morrison's run on the series New X-Men in New X-Men #127. The ghetto was established in Alphabet City, Manhattan (also known as Loisaida), a neighborhood in the East Village (located between Avenues A to D, and between Houston and 14th Streets). This would fall within New York's 12th congressional district and the New York City Council's 2nd district. According to the front cover of X-Factor #31, it had a population of 743, having been much reduced by the Decimation.

District X also refers to a comic book series about the neighborhood and its inhabitants. Written by David Hine, the series was a police procedural, starring Bishop and Ismael Ortega, who investigated crimes committed by and against the ghetto's mutant residents. The series also explored Ortega's complicated personal relationships and gradual descent into drug abuse and adultery. It ran as District X for 14 monthly issues beginning in May 2004, then as Mutopia X as part of the crossover House of M event for five monthly issues beginning in July 2005.

District X: The area

The rise in Manhattan's mutant population, coupled with racism among normal humans, led to mutants forming their own community in Manhattan's Lower East Side (described as the fictional 'Middle East Side' in Peter David's X-Factor). Although humans lived in this neighborhood, they formed a minority. NYX established that District X is an official title for the region.

The neighborhood was poor, overcrowded and violent, with a high crime rate and warring mutant gangs. Most of the residents regarded it as a ghetto. It was described in District X as having the "highest unemployment rate in the USA, the highest rate of illiteracy and the highest severe overcrowding outside of Los Angeles", even though New York City as a whole had seen a decrease in violent crime. (These figures would suggest a large population.) It also had the highest crime rates in the country for narcotics, prostitution, and burglary. Many of its inhabitants had mutations more akin to curses than gifts, further exacerbating the neighborhood's poverty and disadvantage. It also had a large 'underground' population, inhabiting tunnels beneath the neighborhood and living in homeless squalor. Many residents were immigrants, such as Bosnian immigrant Dzemal. In X-Men Unlimited #2, Bishop noted that "there are mutants in District X from every nation on Earth. Every race, religion and culture." Margaret O'Connell, writing for Sequential Tart, describes District X as "the mutant ghetto of the Marvel Universe version of New York City", and as "a slum where minor-league mutants from all over the globe – often more visibly handicapped or disfigured by their genetic abnormalities than the relatively glamorous and outwardly normal X-Men – have congregated in a disaffected and varyingly dysfunctional clump."

There were also a range of mutant-owned businesses, clubs and restaurants, as well as a burgeoning mutant subculture. Bands such as 'Sentinel Bait' and 'Juggernauts' were mentioned as parts of this subculture, while mutant fashion designers like Jumbo Carnation and nightclubs such as Daniel's Inferno created a vibrant, mutant-oriented nightlife. In this respect, District X may be considered a Marvel Universe analogue to Harlem, the Meatpacking District, or Little Italy, as a cultural center, 'ethnic' enclave and population hub for a disenfranchised minority.

Grant Morrison's creation of an analogy to an ethnic ghetto has been praised, with J. Caleb Mozzocco noting that "[i]f the mutants were always being likened to oppressed ethnic groups and minorities, then why not treat them like a real ethnic group, complete with mutant language, styles, culture and a "Mutant Town" in New York City?" David Brothers, writing for 4thletter!, notes that:

Morrison turned mutants into a subculture, a logical extension of what happens when new elements are introduced into society. They were still oppressed, but they actually had some kind of culture to go along with their oppression. He gave them their own Chinatown, their own Little Italy, and made it a point to show that mutants, while not entirely accepted just yet, were more than just mutant paramilitary teams.

During the House of M storyline, the district was transformed into a rich, exclusively mutant neighborhood named Mutopia X (during the same storyline, Hell's Kitchen was transformed into a human ghetto called Sapien Town). After this story, the residents suffered the 'Decimation', with most of them stripped of their mutant abilities. Many remaining mutants were moved to a relocation camp on the grounds of the Xavier Institute.

Some former mutants remained in District X, with many — like Quicksilver and Rictor – suffering from depression and alienation. After the Decimation, the district became known as the (fictional) 'Middle East Side', losing many of its distinctive characteristics. The area became increasingly depopulated as former mutants sought to live normal lives. In X-Factor, anti-mutant riots gripped the district after the Decimation, with agents of the human supremacist group Purity roaming the area in X-Men: The 198.

In Peter David's X-Factor (vol.3), The former ghetto was the base of operations for X-Factor Investigations, who frequently dealt with the aftermath of the Decimation and its effects on the local community. In the Civil War storyline, Jamie Madrox and his team declared 'Mutant Town' a sanctuary for superheroes being pursued by the government. This brought them into conflict with the regular X-Men team, who eventually allowed them to have their way.

The former 'Mutant Town' was later besieged by X-Cell, a terrorist group composed of former mutants who blamed the United States government for the loss of their powers. After the events of X-Men: Messiah Complex, the neighborhood was briefly taken over by Arcade, working for an ex-Purifier, Taylor.

Mutant Town was completely destroyed in X-Factor #31, 'The Middle East Side is Burning', as a 'back-up' plan by Arcade following his defeat. A series of explosions incinerated much of the neighborhood, with Arcade's force fields preventing fire fighters from entering the area until the entire district had been utterly annihilated. In X-Factor #32, Valerie Cooper announced that the ruins would be demolished and replaced with suburban housing, and that "in a few decades, no one will even know that this used to be called Mutant Town".

District X: The series

District X was a comic book series published by Marvel Comics. A police procedural, it was set in 'Mutant Town'.

The series starred the X-Man and FBI agent Lucas Bishop, assigned to the ghetto to investigate rising crime rates among the population in New York's (fictional) '11th Precinct' in Alphabet City. Bishop works with NYPD patrolman Ismael Ortega, an ordinary human married to a mutant (Armena Ortega). A major subplot concerned Ismael's relationship with his family, with the stresses of his job adversely affecting his home life.

Publication history
The series was part of the Marvel Knights imprint. It started in X-Men Unlimited v2 #2 and then ran for fourteen issues from July 2004 to August 2005. It briefly changed title to Mutopia X for five issues, between September 2005 and January 2006, before its cancellation.

The series was written by British writer David Hine, who previously worked on the Mambo series for 2000 AD.

It was originally drawn by Australian artist David Yardin, followed by Filipino artist Lan Medina. The series was mostly inked by Filipino artist Alejandro "Boy" Sicat. All artists involved worked with Brian Haberlin's Avalon Studios during the series' publication.

During the House of M crossover, the series was replaced by the miniseries Mutopia X. Hine continued some of the series' plot points in X-Men: The 198 miniseries.

Plot

Mr. M (#1–6) 

Officers Gus Kucharsky and Ismael Ortega are assigned to New York's 11th Precinct, commonly known as District X or 'Mutant Town'. While investigating allegations that Jake Costanza is holding his mutant wife against her will and abusing her, Kucharsky falls under Mrs. Costanza's mutant mental powers and kills them both, before attempting to take his own life. Gus survives and Ortega covers for him. Gus is forced to retire early and Izzy is assigned to serve as the liaison to federal agent, Lucas Bishop.

Violence erupts between rival crime lords "Shaky" Kaufman and "Filthy Frankie" Zapruder over a mutant, Toad Boy, and the addictive narcotic he produces (known as 'Toad Juice'). When Kaufman learns of the lucrative sales of 'Toad Juice' in District X, he raids Zapruder's facilities and kidnaps the Toad Boy for himself. However, it is unknown that Toad Juice can be fatal to normal humans; a theft of the drug leads to the death of over a dozen human teenagers.

After the death of a human patron at the nightclub Daniel's Inferno caused by exposure to Toad Juice, the police begin a desperate investigation before other unsuspecting addicts face the same fate. This prompts a turf war between Zapruder and Kaufman. Both men are eventually arrested.

When Absolom Mercator finally decides to use his powers to try to help others, his efforts backfire and he suffers an intense identity crisis. Believing that he must use his powers to destroy Mutant Town, Mercator warns his friend, Hanna Levy so that she can escape safely. The police intervene and use Lara the Illusionist to show Mr. M the devastation he could unleash. This snaps the mutant back to his senses and he willingly returns to his peaceful life of quiet isolation after a short period in jail.

Underworld (#7–12)

A series of brutal murders followed by a mysterious blackout leads to an investigation of the growing underground mutant community, called the Tunnel Rats. Calling themselves "Those Who Live in Darkness", the tunnelers claim responsibility for the blackout and state that they want the city to leave them alone. In recent months, police and social services have put pressure on the Tunnel Rats by destroying their homes and remanding their children into state custody.

Tensions with the Tunnel Rats come to a head just as Bishop and Officer Ortega manage to track down The Worm, a hideously mutated young man who is seeking revenge for being cast out by his parents. Bishop convinces many of the Tunnel Rats to rejoin surface society but a small band decides to dwell deeper in the tunnels under Mutant Town. Their journey is cut short by The Worm who massacres them all before being stopped by Bishop and Ortega, who kills him.

One of Us (#13–14)

William "Billy" Bates discovers that he is a mutant, calling himself "The Porcupine", and becomes a frequent patron at the Café Des Artistes. He falls in love with the Café's waitress, Sylvie Lauziere. When a group of anti-mutant humans start harassing her, Billy steps in and inadvertently kills several humans with his emerging powers. He barricades himself in the Café with Sylvie, which the authorities perceive as a hostage situation. In order to hide the fact that a mutant slaughtered several members of Purity, an anti-mutant movement, Alexei Vazhin orders hitwoman Sashenka Popova to kill the boy, and pays hush money to the Lauzieres to cover up the truth of the incident.

Mutopia X (#1–5)

The Scarlet Witch transforms the entire world into a mutant paradise ruled by her father Magneto. This shift in reality turns District X into "Mutopia X", the center of art and culture in the new mutant-dominated world. The denizens of District X find themselves in a newly elevated societal status. Lara the Illusionist is a movie star married to entertainment mogul, Daniel "Shaky" Kaufman. Absolon Mercator and Gregor Smerdyakov have founded the Center for Transformation and Illumination and are the center of a spiritual following as they help mutants achieve their genetic potential. Ishmael Ortega is tasked with protecting Mercator from assassination.

After the Decimation, Ishmael Ortega's daughter dies. He attempts suicide, before reuniting with his family.

Characters
District Xs large ensemble cast included:

 A "mysterious stranger" called Mr. M''' (also the title of the first story-arc), who attempted to destroy District X out of sheer world-weariness but was stopped by Bishop and Ortega.
 Two rival crime lords, "Filthy" Frankie Zapruder and Daniel "Shaky" Kaufman.
 Gregor Smerdyakov, a mutant who puts down roots whenever he falls asleep.
 Winston Hobbes, a large worm-like mutant who inhabits the District X sewer system.
 Lara the Illusionist, a high-paid call-girl whose customers include 'a former President of the United States', capable of creating highly realistic illusions and fantasies.
 Armena Ortega, wife of Ismael Ortega who generates a protective bubble when she sleeps.

The district also possessed a large population of mutants whose mutations and/or personalities made them unsuitable for the flashier or more dangerous "super" life. These include:

 A woman who can burst into flames but is not immune to being burnt.
 A man whose sole power is that his skin is bright blue.
 A woman who could control men with the sound of her voice (her husband kept her bound and gagged in their apartment because of this).
 A boy who has large skin flaps under his arms.

 Reception 

 Critical reception 
In his review of issue #3, Paul O'Brien described the series as "one of the best things to come out of Reload". In his review of 2004, O'Brien noted that "[District X has] not been a complete creative success, but at least it's been trying." However, O'Brien was less favourable to later issues of the series; in his review of District X in 2005, he noted that "ultimately, District X feels like a case of potential never quite realised – and not just because it got cut off by a change in the direction of the line".Comic Book Galaxy noted, with reference to the Mr. M arc (issues #1–6), that "the potential for an excellent book is evident". Comics Bulletin were highly favourable to the series, stating that "[i]t is a rare comic book that is able to breathe new life into a stale genre, and yet that is precisely what District X has managed to do... District X is more than just a traditional superhero comic, establishing itself as an entertaining blend of action, crime noir and social commentary".

Writing for Sequential Tart, Margaret O'Connell praised the series as an "absorbing, well-crafted tale which effectively combines both crime and science fictional elements", comparing the series to George R. R. Martin's Wild Cards series, NYPD Blue, and DC Comics' Gotham Central.

Collected editions
The series, both written by David Hine, was collected into two trade paperbacks:

 Mr. M (collects District X #1–6, with pencils by David Yardin, Lan Medina and Mike Perkins, and inks by Alejandro Sicat, Avalon Studios and Drew Hennessy, 144 pages, January 2005)
 Underground (collects District X #7–14 and the prologue from X-Men Unlimited #2, with art by Adi Granov, pencils by Lan Medina, and inks by Alejandro Sicat, 200 pages, October 2005)Mutopia X was collected into the trade paperback House of M: Mutopia X and as part of the hardcover collection House of M, Vol 4: No More Mutants.

In other media
Video games
 Mutant Town appears in Marvel Heroes. It gets founded after there is an increase of the mutant population in New York City, and the mutants felt a need for a place of their own. However, the city is under almost constant attack of the Purifiers who want to kill all its inhabitants.
 District X appears in the digital collectible card game Marvel Snap''.

See also
 Asteroid M
 Genosha

References

External links
 
 UncannyXmen.Net

2004 comics debuts
Fictional elements introduced in 2002
Marvel Comics titles
Marvel Comics locations
X-Men titles
Fictional neighborhoods
Manhattan in fiction